William Sherman Jewell (May 12, 1867 – January 29, 1956) was an American politician and lawyer.

Biography
Jewell was born in Logan County, Illinois, the son of Julia Smith and John F. Jewell, a Civil War veteran who participated in General William Tecumseh Sherman's March to the Sea. Jewell was admitted to the Illinois bar in 1898. He practiced law in Lewistown, Illinois and served as the Lewistown city attorney. Jewell also served as the state's attorney for Fulton County, Illinois and was a Republican. He served in the Illinois Senate from 1915 until 1930. Jewell served as president pro tempore of the senate. Jewell died at a hospital in Peoria, Illinois.

Personal life
Jewell was married to Bernice Harwood (1884-1931). They had 6 children; William S. Jr.,Ida, Josephine, Elizabeth, Clara and Minnie.

References

External links

1867 births
1956 deaths
People from Lewistown, Illinois
People from Logan County, Illinois
District attorneys in Illinois
Illinois lawyers
Republican Party Illinois state senators